Macrosoma semiermis is a moth-like butterfly in the family Hedylidae. It was described by Louis Beethoven Prout in 1932.

References

Hedylidae
Butterflies described in 1932